Trifolium obtusiflorum is a species of clover known by the common name clammy clover. It is native to  California in the Peninsular, Transverse, Sierra Nevada, and the California Coast Ranges and Cascade Range into southwestern Oregon.

It grows in moist habitat such as marshes and streambanks, and disturbed areas.

Description
Trifolium obtusiflorum is an annual herb growing erect in form. It is hairy, glandular, and sticky in texture. The leaves are made up of sharply toothed, pointed oval leaflets up to 4 centimeters in length.

The inflorescence is a head of flowers up to 3 centimeters wide with a base of toothed bracts. Each flower has a calyx of sepals with lobes narrowing into bristles. The flower corolla may be nearly 2 centimeters long and is pink and purple with a white tip.

References

External links
Jepson Manual Treatment - Trifolium obtusiflorum
Trifolium obtusiflorum - Photo gallery

obtusiflorum
Flora of California
Flora of Oregon
Flora of the Cascade Range
Flora of the Klamath Mountains
Flora of the Sierra Nevada (United States)
Natural history of the California chaparral and woodlands
Natural history of the California Coast Ranges
Natural history of the Peninsular Ranges
Natural history of the San Francisco Bay Area
Natural history of the Transverse Ranges
Flora without expected TNC conservation status